Rachel Agatha Keen (born 24 October 1997), known professionally as Raye (stylized in all caps), is a British singer and songwriter. She rose to prominence after being featured on the singles "By Your Side" by Jonas Blue, "You Don't Know Me" by Jax Jones, "Secrets" by Regard, and "Bed" by Joel Corry and David Guetta, all of which have earned her platinum-status BPI certifications.

In July 2021, Raye parted ways with her record label Polydor Records and henceforth became an independent artist. In February 2023, she released her debut studio album My 21st Century Blues, to critical acclaim. The album was preceded by the hit single "Escapism", which peaked at number one on the UK Singles Chart and became her first song to chart on the Billboard Hot 100. 

In addition to her music, Raye has also written tracks for other artists including Beyoncé, Little Mix, David Guetta, John Legend, and Ellie Goulding. In 2019, she was awarded a BMI Award, in recognition for her groundbreaking artistry, creative vision and impact on the future of music. She has been nominated for four Brit Awards, two Ivor Novello Awards, and was short-listed for the BBC's Sound of... poll in 2017, placing third.

Early life 
Keen was born in Tooting, London, to a Ghanaian-Swiss mother and an English father, originally from Yorkshire. As a child, she attended and sang gospel songs in church, where her father was the musical director, and her mother sang in the choir. Later, she moved to Croydon, where she studied at Woodcote High School and attended BRIT School, before dropping out after two years due to feeling "confined...despite learning an extensive amount." Keen spent most of her teenage years learning how to professionally write songs in studio sessions on the weekends.

Career

2014–2018: Welcome to the Winter, breakthrough and EPs
In December 2014, at age 17, Raye released her debut extended play Welcome to the Winter. Raye released the singles "Flowers" and "Alien" in February and April 2015, respectively, the latter featuring London-based rapper Avelino.

In August 2016, Raye released her second EP, Second. The extended play was preceded by promotional singles "Distraction" and "Ambition", the latter featuring rapper Stormzy. "I, U, Us" was released as the lead single from the EP in October 2016. A video was released which was directed by British singer Charli XCX. A live performance video for the song "Shhh" was released in November 2016. Raye was featured on Jonas Blue's single "By Your Side". It was released in October 2016 and peaked at number 15 on the UK Singles Chart. She also featured on Jax Jones' single "You Don't Know Me" in December 2016. The song, co-written by Raye herself, peaked at number three on the UK Singles Chart and has been certified double Platinum by the BPI.

In February 2017, Raye performed her first headline concert at XOYO in Shoreditch. Raye was featured alongside Starrah on the track "Dreamer" from Charli XCX's mixtape Number 1 Angel, which was released in March 2017. Stand-alone singles, "The Line" and "Sober (Stripped)" were released in May and August, respectively. In November, Raye released "Decline" (featuring Mr Eazi), which peaked at number 15 on the UK Singles Chart and has been certified Platinum.

In February 2018, Raye released the single titled "Cigarette" (with Mabel and Stefflon Don). The song peaked at number 41 on the UK Singles Chart and has been certified Silver by the BPI. In March 2018, Raye collaborated with Kojo Funds and released "Check" which peaked at number 26 in the UK and is certified Gold. Both "Decline" and "Cigarette" would appear on Raye's third extended play, titled Side Tape, which was released in May 2018. A video for promotional single "Confidence" (with Maleek Berry and Nana Rogues), was also released that month. Later in 2018, Raye released the stand-alone single titled, "Friends", which peaked at number 66 in the UK. In September 2018, Raye supported Halsey on the European leg of the Hopeless Fountain Kingdom Tour. In October 2018, Raye embarked on her own headlining tour, visiting a number of cities around the UK and Ireland.

2019–2020: Euphoric Sad Songs 
In February 2019, Raye was featured on the song "Tipsy" by Odunsi. In April 2019, it was announced Raye would support Khalid on his Free Spirit World Tour in Autumn 2019, alongside Mabel. Raye collaborated with David Guetta on the single "Stay (Don't Go Away)", which was released in May 2019 and peaked at number 41 on the UK Singles Chart. Raye was revealed to be a co-writer on the track "Bigger" by American singer Beyoncé, which was featured on the soundtrack album The Lion King: The Gift, released in July 2019. In August 2019, Raye released the single "Love Me Again", whilst a remix of the song with Jess Glynne was later released. The single later peaked at number 55 on the UK Singles Chart and has been certified Silver. Another Guetta collaboration, "Make It to Heaven", was released in November 2019 along with producer Morten. Follow up promotional singles "Please Don't Touch" and "All of My Love", the latter featuring rapper Young Adz, were released in December 2019 and February 2020, respectively.

"Tequila" was released as a single in collaboration with DJs Jax Jones and Martin Solveig in February 2020. The song peaked at number 21 on the UK Singles Chart as well as peaking inside the top 20 in Ireland and Scotland. The track received a Gold certification in the UK. A collaboration with DJ Regard titled "Secrets" was released in April 2020. The song peaked at number six on the UK Singles Chart and topped the UK Dance Chart. The song also reached the top ten in Ireland and Scotland as well as on the US Billboard Dance/Electronic Songs chart. "Secrets" charted in numerous countries such as the Netherlands, France, and Germany, making it Raye's first chart appearance as a lead artist. In July 2020, Raye released the single "Natalie Don't".

In November 2020, Raye released her first mini-album Euphoric Sad Songs, featuring previous releases "Love Me Again", "Please Don't Touch", "Secrets", and "Natalie Don't" plus additional new singles "Love of Your Life" and the album's fifth official single, "Regardless" (with Rudimental). The latter single peaked inside the top 40 in the United Kingdom as well on the US Dance/Electronic Songs chart. The project is centered around the theme of the "seven stages of grief" with Raye stating that she wrote the album during each stage of grief with the creative process helping heal her broken heart.

2021–present: Departure from Polydor, My 21st Century Blues and international recognition 

A collaborative single, "Bed" with Joel Corry and David Guetta, was released in February 2021. The song would peak at number three on the UK Singles Chart, becoming Raye's highest charting single as a lead artist on the chart. In June 2021, Raye released the single "Call On Me", which was intended to serve as the lead single for her debut studio album. Raye co-wrote and co-produced the song "Let Them Know" by Mabel, which was also released the same month.

Later that month, Raye revealed that her record label, Polydor Records, had been withholding her debut album for several years. The statement received support from fellow artists including Charli XCX, MNEK, and Rina Sawayama. Raye later went on a hiatus following the statements and in July 2021, she announced that she had parted ways with Polydor to work as an independent artist. Raye closed the year performing her Euphoric Sad Show headline UK and Ireland tour.

In June 2022, Raye released the single "Hard Out Here", her first release as an independent artist. The second single, "Black Mascara", was released in August 2022 and was followed by a dual single release, "Escapism" (featuring 070 Shake), and "The Thrill is Gone" in October 2022. All singles would come together to form Raye's debut studio album, My 21st Century Blues, which was released in February 2023. In support of the album, Raye embarked on a mini tour entitled The Story So Far, which marked her first headlining shows in Europe and North America. This will be followed by the My 21st Century Blues Tour, which will commence in February 2023. By December 2022, following the track going viral on multiple streaming platforms, "Escapism" ascended into the top ten of the UK Singles Chart, later peaking at number one in the first week of 2023, marking Raye's highest charting single and first chart-topper in the country. In the United States, "Escapism" became Raye's first song to chart on the Billboard Hot 100, currently peaking at number 22. The track also charted internationally, becoming Raye's best-charting single of her career to date in various territories.

In January 2023, Raye opened for Lewis Capaldi's Broken by Desire to Be Heavenly Sent Tour in the UK and Ireland. Raye was also announced to be the opener for Kali Uchis' Red Moon in Venus Tour, during the North American leg which will commence in April. In February 2023, Raye made her U.S. network television debut performance on The Late Show with Stephen Colbert.

Artistry
Raye grew up listening to R&B, neo-soul, and indie rock bands like Alt-J and Bombay Bicycle Club. She has expressed admiration for Lady Gaga, The Weeknd, Frank Ocean, and Lauryn Hill. Jazz artists such as Jill Scott, Ella Fitzgerald, and Nina Simone have also inspired her.

Personal life 
Raye identifies as a Christian and credits her faith for helping her to overcome her personal struggles. In an interview for Rolling Stone UK, Raye revealed that she had dealt with struggles with body dysmorphia, addiction, eating disorder, and anxiety. In a separate interview for the BBC, Raye revealed she had been sexually assaulted by a record producer earlier into her career.

Discography

 My 21st Century Blues (2023)

Awards and nominations

Tours
Headlining
Raye Live 
Euphoric Sad Show Tour 
The Story So Far... 
My 21st Century Blues Tour 

Opening act
Communion Tour 
Take Me Home Tour 
The Girls Tour 
Hopeless Fountain Kingdom Tour 
Free Spirit World Tour 
Broken by Desire to Be Heavenly Sent Tour 
Red Moon in Venus Tour

Notes

References

External links

1997 births
21st-century Black British women singers
British contemporary R&B singers
Dance-pop musicians
English people of Ghanaian descent
English people of Swiss descent
English women pop singers
English women singer-songwriters
Living people
People educated at the BRIT School
People educated at Woodcote High School
Polydor Records artists
Singers from London